Coldharbour, also spelled Cold Harbour, Cold Harborough, Cold Herbergh, Cold Herberge, and Cold Inn, were two London neighbouring estates in the since dissolved parishes of All-Hallows-the-Less and All-Hallows-the-Great, in today's Dowgate Ward of the City of London. From the 13th century to the mid-17th century Coldharbour occupied the area between Upper Thames Street and the Thames to the east of Cannon Street station. It was destroyed in the Great Fire of 1666. One of the estates was used by the Dukes of Exeter and briefly as a college of heralds.

History
Coldharbour was a liberty until 1608, when James I brought it within the jurisdiction of the City of London.

Coldharbour House
Coldharbour House, Cold Harbour, Cold Harborough or Cold Inn was a medieval mansion house on the north bank of the River Thames just upstream from London Bridge and close to the site of today's Cannon Street station.

The house was located in Upper Thames Street, a narrow riverside lane, along with other noblemen's mansions. The house was first mentioned in the reign of Edward II as belonging to the knight Sir John Abel. In 1334 it was bought by the merchant draper Sir John de Pulteney, who was four times Lord Mayor of London in the 1330s, and became known as Pulteney's Inn. At the end of the 14th century, it belonged to John Holland, 1st Duke of Exeter, a half-brother of King Richard II, whom he entertained in the house.

In 1410, King Henry IV granted the property to his son, the future King Henry V. Richard III gave Coldharbour to the College of Arms, of which he was patron, for storing records and to provide living space. Henry VII took possession of the house away from the college and gave it to his mother, Lady Margaret Beaufort, Countess of Richmond and Derby. The house later became the property of the Earls of Shrewsbury, and its name was changed to Shrewsbury House.

Coldharbour was either dismantled by the 6th Earl of Shrewsbury or destroyed by the Great Fire of London in 1666, although a later building with the same name, constructed on the same site, was used as the hall of the Company of Watermen and Lightermen until 1778.

See also
 List of demolished buildings and structures in London

Notes

References

See also
Watermen's stairs

Buildings and structures in the City of London
City of London
Former houses in the City of London
City of London, History of the
History of the City of London
Liberties of London
1666 disestablishments